Rhyzobius forestieri is a species of lady beetle in the family Coccinellidae. It is found in Australia, North America, Oceania, and Europe. The species is thought to be originally from Australia and recently introduced to parts of Europe in the 1980s as a biological control agent to control the Olive Scale pest (Saissetia oleae).

References

Further reading

 
 

Coccinellidae
Articles created by Qbugbot
Beetles described in 1853